Kjell Nilsson can refer to:

 Kjell Nilsson (actor) (born 1949), Swedish actor who relocated to Australia
 Kjell Nilsson (cyclist) (born 1962), Swedish cyclist
 Kjell Nilsson (footballer) (active 1957-58), Swedish footballer
 Kjell Nilsson (Swedish Air Force officer) (1943–2018), Swedish Air Force lieutenant general and sports administrator